Barbarians at the Gate is a 1993 American biographical comedy-drama television film directed by Glenn Jordan and written by Larry Gelbart, based on the 1989 book of the same name by Bryan Burrough and John Helyar. The film stars James Garner, Jonathan Pryce, and Peter Riegert. It tells the true story of F. Ross Johnson, who was the president and CEO of RJR Nabisco.

Barbarians at the Gate received generally positive reviews from critics. The film earned nine nominations at the 45th Primetime Emmy Awards, winning one for Outstanding Made for Television Movie. It also won Best Miniseries or Television Film and Best Actor in a Miniseries or Television Film for Garner at the 51st Golden Globe Awards.

Plot
Self-made multimillionaire F. Ross Johnson, CEO of RJR Nabisco, decides to take the tobacco and food conglomerate company private in 1988 after receiving advance news of the likely market failure of the company's smokeless cigarette called Premier, the development of which had been intended to finally boost the company's stock price.

The free-spending Johnson's bid for the company is opposed by two of the pioneers of the leveraged buyout, Henry Kravis and his cousin. Kravis feels betrayed when, after Johnson initially discusses doing the LBO with Kravis, he takes the potentially enormous deal to another firm, the Shearson Lehman Hutton division of American Express.

Other bidders emerge, including Ted Forstmann and his company, Forstmann Little, after Kravis and Johnson are unable to reconcile their differences. The bidding goes to unprecedented heights, and when executive Charles Hugel becomes aware of how much Johnson stands to profit in a transaction that will put thousands of Nabisco employees out of work, he quips, "Now I know what the 'F' in F. Ross Johnson stands for." The greed is so evident, Kravis's final bid is declared the winner, even though Johnson's was higher.

The title of the book and movie comes from a statement by Forstmann in which he calls Kravis' money "phoney junk bond crap" and how he and his brother are "real people with real money," and that to stop raiders like Kravis: "We need to push the barbarians back from the city gates."

Cast 
 James Garner as F. Ross Johnson
 Jonathan Pryce as Henry Kravis
 Peter Riegert as Peter Cohen
 Joanna Cassidy as Linda Robinson
 Fred Dalton Thompson as Jim Robinson
 Leilani Sarelle as Laurie Johnson
 Matt Clark as Edward A. Horrigan, Jr.
 Jeffrey DeMunn as H. John Greeniaus
 David Rasche as Ted Forstmann
 Tom Aldredge as Charles Hugel
 Graham Beckel as Don Kelly
 Peter Dvorsky as George R. Roberts
 Mark Harelik as Peter Atkins
 Joseph Kell as Nick Forstmann
 Rita Wilson as Carolyne Roehm-Kravis
 Ron Canada as Vernon Jordan

Awards and nominations

References

External links
 

1993 films
1993 television films
1993 comedy-drama films
1990s business films
1990s biographical drama films
American comedy-drama television films
American business films
American biographical drama films
Biographical films about businesspeople
Biographical television films
Television films based on books
Films based on non-fiction books
Films directed by Glenn Jordan
Films scored by Richard Gibbs
Films set in the 1980s
Films with screenplays by Larry Gelbart
HBO Films films
Columbia Pictures films
Wall Street films
R. J. Reynolds Tobacco Company
Best Miniseries or Television Movie Golden Globe winners
Primetime Emmy Award for Outstanding Made for Television Movie winners
American drama television films
1990s English-language films
1990s American films